Maria di Rohan is a melodramma tragico, or tragic opera, in three acts by Gaetano Donizetti. The Italian libretto was written by Salvadore Cammarano, after Lockroy and Edmond Badon's Un duel sous le cardinal de Richelieu, which had played in Paris in 1832. The story is based on events of the life of Marie de Rohan.

Performance history
The opera premiered at the Kärntnertortheater, Vienna on 5 June 1843. In newer times, it was staged by the Grand Théâtre de Genève in 2001 and by the Donizetti Festival, Bergamo, in 2011. The opera was performed in concert by Opera Rara, London, in 2009 and by Washington Concert Opera in 2018.

Roles

Synopsis 

The story of Maria Di Rohan is both simple (the classic love triangle) and complicated.  Chalais loves Maria, who has been forced to secretly marry Chevreuse.  Chevreuse is in deep trouble, because he has killed a nephew of Richelieu. The opera is divided into three parts: Unfortunate Consequences of Duels; Not Love But Gratitude; Senseless Revenge.

Time: Around 1630
Place: Paris

Act 1
Maria seeks Chalais’ help. Chalais offers it, hoping that Maria will join him, obviously not knowing that she is already married to Chevreuse.  Chalais succeeds and Chevreuse is pardoned.
Gondi appears on the scene and insults Maria. Chalais challenges him to a duel, and Chevreuse offers to be the second.  Richelieu is suddenly ousted from the court, and Chalais is offered his post.  Everything looks great for him, but Maria is terribly worried.  Richelieu's demise means that Chevreuse can disclose his marriage without fear.  When he points to Maria, Chalais’ world begins to collapse.

Act 2
Chalais writes a love letter to Maria and encloses her portrait. Both are hidden in his desk,  to be given to Maria should he perish.  He's suddenly visited by Maria who tells him that Richelieu has regained power.  She tells Chalais to flee or he will be executed.  Chevreuse is heard approaching and Maria hides in an adjoining chamber. Chevreuse tells Chalais that they must leave for the Gondi duel and Chalais says he will follow.
Of course he doesn't follow, but stays to profess his love for Maria and she also admits that she has always and continues to love him.  When he finally leaves for the duel, it is too late. Chevreuse has taken his place and is wounded.

Act 3
Chevreuse’s residence

He tells Maria and Chalais that he will arrange to have Chalais escape from the city. Chalais leaves, and again, everything looks good at first, but disaster strikes.  Chalais’ letter and Maria's portrait are discovered by one of the courtiers in Chalais’ desk.  Chalais tells Maria about the letters and she says all is lost.  Once again she tells him to flee through a secret passage, and he does,  but tells her he will return if she does not follow him within an hour.  Maria sings a prayer, Havvi un Dio che in sua clemenza.

The courtier gives the letter and portrait to Chevreuse and he is alternatively nostalgic and enraged.  He confronts Maria and vows revenge. Suddenly Chalais returns for Maria through the secret passage.  In a final trio Maria pleads for Chevreuse to kill her, Chalais says he doesn't fear death, and Chevreuse thunders that Chalais’ death is imminent.  He gives Chalais a dueling pistol and the two race out.  A shot is heard.  Chevreuse is furious because Chalais has committed suicide.  He throws the letter and portrait to the floor before Maria and cries out La vita coll’infamia A te, donna infidel / "Life with infamy to you, faithless woman".

Note: Donizetti wrote a culminating cabaletta for Maria, but crossed it out, preferring to end the opera in a distinctly non-bel canto, but highly dramatic manner.

Recordings

References
Notes

Sources
Allitt, John Stewart (1991), Donizetti: in the light of Romanticism and the teaching of Johann Simon Mayr, Shaftesbury: Element Books, Ltd (UK); Rockport, MA: Element, Inc.(United States)
Ashbrook, William (1982), Donizetti and His Operas, Cambridge University Press.  
Ashbrook, William  (1998), "Donizetti, Gaetano" in Stanley Sadie  (Ed.),  The New Grove Dictionary of Opera, Vol. One. London: MacMillan Publishers, Inc.   
Ashbrook, William and Sarah Hibberd (2001), in Holden, Amanda (Ed.), The New Penguin Opera Guide, New York: Penguin Putnam. .  pp. 224 – 247.
Black, John (1982), Donizetti’s Operas in Naples, 1822—1848. London: The Donizetti Society.
Loewenberg, Alfred (1970). Annals of Opera, 1597-1940, 2nd edition.  Rowman and Littlefield
Osborne, Charles, (1994),  The Bel Canto Operas of Rossini, Donizetti, and Bellini,  Portland, Oregon: Amadeus Press. 
Sadie, Stanley, (Ed.); John Tyrell (Exec. Ed.) (2004), The New Grove Dictionary of Music and Musicians.  2nd edition. London: Macmillan.    (hardcover).   (eBook).
 Weinstock, Herbert (1963), Donizetti and the World of Opera in Italy, Paris, and Vienna in the First Half of the Nineteenth Century, New York: Pantheon Books.

External links
 Donizetti Society (London) website
 Italian libretto

Italian-language operas
Operas by Gaetano Donizetti
1843 operas
Operas
Operas set in Paris
Operas based on plays